Cycling at the 2019 Military World Games was held in Wuhan, China from 19 to 21 October 2019.

Medal summary

Men

Women

Medal table

Source

References

External links
Cycling at the 7th Military World Games
Results book

Cycling
2019
2019
2019 in road cycling